Twomile Creek may refer to:

Twomile Creek (Chattahoochee River tributary), a stream in Georgia
Twomile Creek (Marmaton River), a stream in Missouri
Twomile Creek (North Fork Salt River), a stream in Missouri
Twomile Creek (Warm Fork Spring River), a stream in Missouri
Twomile Creek (Uwharrie River tributary), a stream in Randolph County, North Carolina
Twomile Creek (East Branch Oil Creek tributary), a stream in Crawford County, Pennsylvania
Twomile Creek (Kanawha River), a stream in West Virginia
Twomile Creek (Nepco Lake tributary), a stream in Wisconsin
Two Mile Creek (Yellow River tributary), a stream in Wisconsin